Crestwood is a home rule-class city in Oldham County, Kentucky, United States just outside Louisville's Northeast End. The population was 4,531 at the 2010 census. CNN listed it as the 52nd best place to live in America in 2005. It was first settled in the early 19th century and renamed Crestwood in 1909.

Geography
{
  "type": "FeatureCollection",
  "features": [
    {
      "type": "Feature",
      "properties": {},
      "geometry": {
        "type": "Point",
        "coordinates": [
          -85.47243118286133,
          38.323385140651844
        ]
      }
    }
  ]
}Crestwood is located at  (38.324557, -85.483300).

Demographics

As of the census of 2000, there were 1,999 people, 811 households, and 548 families residing in the city. The racial makeup of the city was 94.80% White, 2.15% African American, 0.35% Native American, 0.60% Asian, 1.10% from other races, and 1.00% from two or more races. Hispanic or Latino of any race were 3.15% of the population.

There were 811 households, out of which 33.9% had children under the age of 18 living with them, 51.5% were married couples living together, 12.9% had a female householder with no husband present, and 32.4% were non-families. 26.8% of all households were made up of individuals, and 7.4% had someone living alone who was 65 years of age or older. The average household size was 2.45 and the average family size was 3.02.

In the city, the population was spread out, with 25.9% under the age of 18, 9.0% from 18 to 24, 32.6% from 25 to 44, 23.1% from 45 to 64, and 9.5% who were 65 years of age or older. The median age was 35 years. For every 100 females, there were 89.8 males. For every 100 females age 18 and over, there were 87.9 males.

The median income for a household in the city was $42,619, and the median income for a family was $55,000. Males had a median income of $37,250 versus $23,984 for females. The per capita income for the city was $21,569. About 6.6% of families and 7.4% of the population were below the poverty line, including 7.6% of those under age 18 and 8.7% of those age 65 or over.

Education
Crestwood has a lending library, South Oldham Library, a branch of the Oldham County Public Library.

Crestwood has six public schools.

 Camden Station Elementary
 Crestwood Elementary
 Kenwood Station Elementary
 South Oldham Middle School
 South Oldham High School
 East Oldham Middle School

Parks 
Crestwood has two parks as of March 2021, including The Maples Park and Peggy Baker Park.

Notable residents
Mary Spencer Nay, painter and printmaker, born in Crestwood

References

External links
"Crestwood: Rails Put Farming Community on the Track to Commercial and Residential Development" — Article by Kim Chappell of The Courier-Journal
https://crestwoodky.gov/ — Crestwood Community Website [In development as of March 2021]

Cities in Kentucky
Cities in Oldham County, Kentucky
Louisville metropolitan area